Maurice Schmitt (born 23 January 1930 at Marseille, Bouches-du-Rhône), is a French general and  chief of the general staff headquarters of the Armies (CEMA) from 16 November 1987 until 23 April 1991. He was then appointed as Governor of Les Invalides until 1996.

Biography

Early life

Maurice is the son of général Gaston Schmitt.

Military career 

He entered the École spéciale militaire de Saint-Cyr in October 1948. After attending a course at the artillery school, he was assigned to the 1st Colonial Artillery Regiment (1er RAC), Troupes coloniales (known as Troupes de marine since 1958), whose barracks was at Melun.

Designated to serve in the Far East in January 1953, he was assigned to the 4th Colonial Artillery Regiment 4e RAC, then the North-West Operational Artillery Group (GONO), the designated name of the garrison of Dien Bien Phu. During the subsequent battle, he was taken  as a prisoner of war on 7 May 1954. He was released on 2 September 1954.

Knight Order of the Order of the Légion d'honneur at 25, he became a military instructor at the infantry application school until September 1956, he was then assigned to the 3rd Colonial Parachute Regiment (3e RPC) in North Africa where he commanded a combat support company from 1958 until October 1959. In 1959, he was made an Officer of the Order of the Légion d'honneur at 29.

Following these engagements, his name often came up and was cited when the torture practices were evoked during the Algerian war.

Promoted to Colonel in 1974, then Général de brigade in 1979, he became Chief of Staff of the French Army in 1985, then Chef d'état-major des Armées in 1987 responsible for French forces during the Gulf War in 1990 and 1991. He was replaced by Admiral Jacques Lanxade on 23 April 1991. 
 
In 1990, he was elevated to the dignity of Grand-Cross of the Légion d'honneur  and became Governor of Les Invalides in 1991, until 1996.

Recognitions and Honors

 Knight Order of the Légion d'honneur : 1955
 Officer Order of the Légion d'honneur : 1959
 Grand Officier of the Légion d'honneur : 1986
 Grand-Croix  of the Order of the Légion d'honneur : 1990
 Commander Order of National Order of Merit
 Croix de guerre des théâtres d'opérations extérieures 
 Cross for Military Valour
 Colonial Medal
 Commemorative Medal 39-45
 Commemorative Medal of Indochina
 Commemorative Medal of the North Africa (AFN)
 Commander Order of the Legion of Merit (United States)
 Grand Officer of the Order of Merit of the Federal Republic of Germany (Germany)
 Grand Croix of the merit of Norway (Norway)
 Grand Officer of the National Order of the Cedar (Lebanon)
 Grand Officier de la Rose blanche de Finlande (Finland)
 Grand Officer of the Order of the Republic of Tunisia 
 Order of Merit of Venezuela 
 Medal Order of the Legion of Oman 
 Nishan-e-Imtiaz (Order of Excellence) of Pakistan
 Merit Medal of the National Security of the Republic of Korea

Publications

 Deuxième bataille d'Alger, 2002-2007, la bataille judiciaire (The second battle of Algiers),  L'Harmattan, 2008 
 Alger-été 1957: une victoire sur le terrorisme (Algiers summer of 1957 : a victory against terrorism), L'Harmattan, 2002
 Le double jeu du maréchal: légende ou réalité(The double game of the marshal: legend or reality), Presses de la Cité, 1996
 De Diên Biên Phu à Koweït City (From Dien Bien Phu to Kuwait City), Grasset, 1992

References

Notes

1930 births
Living people
French generals
École Spéciale Militaire de Saint-Cyr alumni
Grand Croix of the Légion d'honneur
Commanders of the Ordre national du Mérite
Recipients of the Cross for Military Valour
Recipients of the Croix de guerre des théâtres d'opérations extérieures
Commanders of the Legion of Merit
Knights Commander of the Order of Merit of the Federal Republic of Germany
Grand Officers of the National Order of the Cedar